Bogusław Bagsik (born April 8, 1963 in Bytom, Poland) is a Polish businessman, politician and patron of arts.

He is the founder and owner of ART B. In 1991 Bagsik emigrated to Tel Aviv. As of 1991, Bagsik was the 8th wealthiest person in Poland, according to Wprost magazine.

Honours and awards
  : Kisiel Prize (1991)

Immigration and arrest 
Bagsik was arrested in 1994 at the Zürich airport. After a long extradition procedure, he had been released to Poland in 1996. He was then accused of illegally acquiring 400 mln PLN, bribery, and acting against the interest of his company. On October 20, 2000 he had been sentenced to 9 years in prison. Bagsik was released from prison in May 2004 on Parole.
After his, release Bagsik began further business work and was arrested on April 14, 2014 accused of money laundering of a sum of 11 mln PLN.

Filmography
1991:Guitar Legends, Seville 1991 (documentary) – producer
2000: Zakochani - actor

ART B collection in National Museum, Warsaw
 Pablo Picasso, "Cyrk", 1957, 
 Pablo Picasso, "Tauromachia", 1957
 Oswald Achenbach, "Grobowiec Cecylii Metelli", 1886
 Pierre-Auguste Renoir, "La collation", ok. 1890,
 Stanisław Ignacy Witkiewicz, Portret pana S.A., czerwiec 1939, 62,3 × 48,5
 Johann Georg Bandau II, Waza, lata 20. XIX w.; 41 × 34 × 31
 Jan Jerzy II Bandau, Waza, lata 20. XIX w
 Louis-Nicolas Naudin'a, " Srebrna waza", ok 1820, 1819–38, 30 × 33,2.
 Zygmunt Menkes, Dziewczyna z kwiatem, 42,4 × 34,5
 Teodor Axentowicz, "Na gromniczną"
 Józef Brandt, "Portret towarzysza pancernego na karym koniu"
 Wojciech Kossak, "Odwrót spod Moskwy", 1922
 Wojciech Kossak, "Dziewczyna w chustce", 1918,
 Mela Muter, "Zimowy pejzaż miejsk", "Kutry przy brzegu"
 Alfred Aberdam, "Martwa natura z kwiatami i książką"
 Jacek Malczewski, Portret dziewczynki siedzącej na drabinie, 1922, 97,8 × 69,5
 Jacek Malczewski, Mężczyzna na drabinie, 1922
 Jacek Malczewski, Portret Wincentego Łepkowskiego, 1911, 74 × 93
 Jacek Malczewski, Chrystus w Emaus – dyptyk, 1912, cz. lewa 72,6 × 53,5, cz. prawa 72,5 × 55
 Jacek Malczewski, Portret doktora Ignacego Baslera, 1924, 50,3 × 71,3
 Jacek Malczewski, "Portret Antoniego Lanckorońskiego z ojcem", 1905
 Jacek Malczewski, "Kobieta na tle gaju z jarzębiną", 1917
 Jacek Malczewski, "Kobieta na tle gaju z jarzębiną", 1917
 Tadeusz Makowski, Portret dziewczynki o ciemnych włosach, 46 × 28,5
 Baccarat, Pantera, 15 × 51,2 × 12,3

References 

20th-century Polish businesspeople
21st-century Polish businesspeople
Polish film producers
People from Bytom
Polish emigrants to Israel
1963 births
Living people